Porgy: A Play in Four Acts is a play by Dorothy Heyward and DuBose Heyward, adapted from the short novel by DuBose Heyward. It was first produced by the Theatre Guild and presented October 10, 1927 – August 1928 at the Guild Theatre in New York City. Featuring a cast of African Americans at the insistence of its authors—a decision unusual for its time—the original production starred Frank Wilson, Evelyn Ellis, Jack Carter, and Rose McClendon. Porgy marked the Broadway directing debut of Rouben Mamoulian. The play ran a total of 55 weeks in New York, and the original cast toured the United States twice and performed for 11 consecutive weeks in London.

The play tells the story of Porgy, a disabled black beggar who lives in the slums of Charleston, South Carolina. It relates his efforts to rescue Bess, the woman he loves, from Crown, her violent and possessive lover, and a drug dealer called Sporting Life.

The play is the basis of the libretto of the opera Porgy and Bess (1935).

History

A descendant of Thomas Heyward, Jr., DuBose Heyward was from an old, white family in Charleston, South Carolina. In 1925, he published his first and best-regarded novel, Porgy, which was inspired by a news story and drawn from his sympathetic observations of African American culture. The book was a best seller. Porgy was one of a number of works portraying black life written by white authors, but it was infused with human understanding at a time that such an approach was new.

Heyward's wife, playwright Dorothy Heyward, roughed out a stage adaptation of the novel that persuaded her husband of the story's dramatic possibilities. They wrote the play together, strengthening the character of Bess, incorporating folk songs, and creating a more upbeat ending that shows Porgy following Bess to New York.

Just as the novel had been one of the first to regard African American culture seriously, Porgy was the first authentic presentation of black culture on the Broadway stage. The Heywards insisted that an African American cast perform the play, providing much-needed employment for black actors and offering white audiences a mature view of African American life. DuBose Heyward credited the actors—many of whom had theater experience going back generations—as collaborators whose contributions transformed the drama on the stage.

Production
Sponsored by the Theatre Guild, Porgy was given its premiere on Broadway, running October 10, 1927, to August 1928, at the Guild Theatre and the Republic Theatre.

Porgy then went on tour—for nine weeks in Chicago, 11 weeks in London, and in cities including Boston, Philadelphia, Cincinnati, Washington, Cleveland, Pittsburgh, Baltimore, Detroit, San Francisco, Los Angeles, and others in the northwestern United States and Canada. The show returned to New York, running September 13 to October 1929 at the Martin Beck Theatre.

After a total of 55 weeks in New York, all of the original principal cast members of Porgy toured the nation once again, performing from October 14, 1929, into January 1930.

Porgy marked the Broadway directing debut of Rouben Mamoulian. Settings were designed by Cleon Throckmorton. Portraying an aristocratic Charleston attorney, Erskine Sanford was one of only three white actors in the 65-member cast of Porgy. The boys band from the Jenkins Orphanage of Charleston was also featured.

Cast
The original cast members are listed in order of appearance.

Publication
The Theatre Guild acting version of the play Porgy was published in 1927 by Doubleday, Doran and Company.

References

External links

 Full text of Porgy at HathiTrust Digital Library
 
 Production photographs from the Vandamm Theatrical Photographs collection at the New York Public Library

1927 plays
African-American theatre
All-Black cast Broadway shows
Plays by Dorothy Heyward
Porgy and Bess
Plays adapted into operas